Anna Laura Lepschy (née Momigliano; born 30 November 1933) is an Italian linguist. She is an Emeritus Professor in Italian at University College London.

Early life and education
Lepschy was born on 30 November 1933 in Turin, Italy to parents Arnaldo Dante and Gemma Celestina (Segre) Momigliano. She earned her Bachelor of Letters and Master's degree from Somerville College, Oxford.

Career
In 1977, Lepschy and her husband Giulio Lepschy co-published a book titled The Italian Language Today through Hutchinson & Co. Publishers. The Italian Language Today is a reference book meant to provide an outline of the Italian language and grammar of contemporary Italian. She later co-edited a collection of essays titled Book Production and Letters in the Western European Renaissance:Essays in Honour of Conor Fahy. By 1994, Lepschy was the recipient of the Order of Merit of the Italian Republic and later with the Order of the Star of Italian Solidarity.

In 1984, Lepschy was appointed a Head of the Italian Department at the University College London and founded the Centre for Italian Studies. While teaching, Lepschy co-edited a book with Verina R. Jones titled With a Pen in Her Hand: Women and Writing in Italy in the Nineteenth Century and beyond. The book was a collection of essays delivered at the Conference on Women and Writing in Nineteenth-Century Italy in February 1997. In 2002, Lepschy co-edited another book titled Multilingualism in Italy, Past and Present with Arturo Tosi.

In 2011, Lepschy was the recipient of the Serena Medal from the British Academy.

References

1933 births
Writers from Turin
Living people
Academics of University College London
Recipients of the Order of Merit of the Italian Republic
Italian classical scholars
Alumni of Somerville College, Oxford
Linguists from Italy
Women linguists
Italian translators
Italian women academics
20th-century linguists
20th-century translators
21st-century linguists
21st-century translators